Tin Lily is an album by American singer-songwriter Jeff Black, released in 2005.

Reception

Writing for Allmusic, critic Ronnie D. Lankford, Jr. wrote of the album; "The subtle arrangements of piano, guitar, and organ create a layered underpinning that adds another dimension to a song like "Nineteen" without overpowering it, while the rocking guitar brings a carefree abandon to "Libertine." These shifts in tone also give Tin Lily more variety than 2003's B-Sides and Confessions, Vol. 1, and ultimately make it a more satisfying recording. Black, it seems, has found his comfort zone.."

Track listing 
All songs by Jeff Black
 "Easy On Me" – 2:59
 "Hollow of Your Hand" – 3:22
 "Nineteen" – 5:03
 "Libertine" – 2:54
 "Free at Last" – 4:47
 "Hard Way Out" – 4:19
 "Closer" – 3:15
 "All Days Shine" – 4:11
 "Heaven Now" – 4:13
 "These Days" – 3:22
 "How Long" – 4:23
 "A Better Way" – 4:21

Personnel
Jeff Black – vocals, guitar, piano, keyboards, harmonica
Sam Bush – fiddle, mandolin
Craig Wright – drums, percussion
David Roe – guitar
Kenny Vaughan – guitar
David Jacques – double bass
Kate Campbell – vocals
Matthew Ryan – vocals
Production notes
Gary Paczosa – engineer
Billy Sherrill – engineer
Joey Turner – assistant engineer
Paul Mahern – mixing
Jim DeMain – mastering
Michael Wilson – photography
Mike Delevante – art direction, design

References

2005 albums